The idea of a sphere-world was constructed by French mathematician Henri Poincaré who, while pursuing his argument for conventionalism (see philosophy of space and time),  offered a thought experiment about a sphere with strange properties.

The concept

In addition, all bodies have the same coefficient of dilatation so every body shrinks and expands in similar proportion as they move about the sphere.

How will this world look to inhabitants of this sphere? 

In many ways it will look normal. Bodies will remain intact upon transfer from place to place, as well as seeming to remain the same size (the Spherians would shrink along with them). The geometry, on the other hand, would seem quite different. Supposing the inhabitants were to view rods believed to be rigid, or measure distance with light rays.

These inhabitants would in fact determine that their universe is not ruled by Euclidean geometry, but instead by hyperbolic geometry.

Commentary

This thought experiment is discussed in Roberto Torretti's book Philosophy of Geometry from Riemann to Poincaré and in Jeremy Gray's article "Epistemology of Geometry" in the Stanford Encyclopedia of Philosophy. This sphere-world is also described in Ian Stewart's book Flatterland (chapter 10, Platterland).

References

See also
 Flatland

Thought experiments
Hyperbolic geometry
Philosophy of physics
Henri Poincaré